Santa Margarita (Spanish for "St. Margaret") is a town and  census-designated place located in San Luis Obispo County, California. It was founded in 1889 near Cuesta Peak and San Luis Obispo along State Route 58. The town's name comes from the Mexican Alta California land grant of Rancho Santa Margarita. It is home to the Santa Margarita de Cortona Asistencia site. The population was 1,259 at the 2010 census.

Etymology
Santa Margarita was named for the 13th-century Saint Margaret of Cortona (1247-1297).

Geography
Located in the foothills of the Santa Lucia Mountains, it is one of the most rural communities in San Luis Obispo County. Santa Margarita Lake, a major water source for San Luis Obispo, is located several miles southeast of the town on the headwaters of the Salinas River. It is served by ZIP code 93453 and area code 805.

History
Santa Margarita Valley, with its year-round running streams and abundant acorns, was a meeting place for northern Chumash and southern Salinan around 6500 BCE. The de Anza Expedition traversed the Cuesta Grade into the valley in 1776. After Fr. Junipero Serra founded the Mission San Luis Obispo de Tolosa, he realized that an assistancia (sub-mission) was needed. The Santa Margarita de Cortona Asistencia was founded circa 1775, and was named for the Italian Saint, Santa Margarita de Cortona. The Spanish El Camino Real trail past it is the city's present-day main street.

In 1841, following Mexico’s 1822 independence and 1830s mission secularization, Joaquin Estrada became the owner of the Rancho Santa Margarita. Estrada was famed for his “Rancho Hospitality” with rodeos, BBQs and fiestas. After downturns in the economy and personal debts, Estrada sold the Rancho to the Martin Murphy family in 1860.

Patrick Murphy worked to restore the Rancho to a working agricultural ranch. On April 20, 1889, the Southern Pacific Railroad reached Santa Margarita from Templeton. A “Grand Auction” was held to sell lots for the new town of Santa Margarita along the El Camino Real. While construction down the Cuesta Grade took place, the railroad terminus was in Santa Margarita. This created a boom time in the community. All freight had to be loaded for stage transportation up and down the Cuesta Grade. Town boasted a hotel, restaurants, taverns, blacksmiths, and ice cream parlors. Once the “gap” was closed from Santa Margarita to San Luis Obispo in 1894 the town grew quiet.

Margarita Town saw a renaissance in the roaring 1920s. The El Camino Real was one of the primary roads for seeing California. The town offered a motor inn, hotel, six gas stations, garages, pool halls, restaurants, fraternal organizations, taverns and a baseball team.

The Depression hit town and the surrounding areas hard. The War Department took land from local farmers to build a reservoir on the Salinas River which created Santa Margarita Lake to provide water for Camp San Luis. The war ended before the work was completed and Santa Margarita Lake is now a County Recreation Area.

After Highway 101 bypassed Santa Margarita in 1956, the town was quiet once again.  Today, it's a small town of 1,300 people. It is a quiet artist and family community.

Demographics
The 2010 United States Census reported that Santa Margarita had a population of 1,259. The racial makeup of Santa Margarita was 1,077 (85.5%) White, 8 (0.6%) African American, 28 (2.2%) Native American, 34 (2.7%) Asian, 0 (0.0%) Pacific Islander, 42 (3.3%) from other races, and 70 (5.6%) from two or more races. Hispanic or Latino of any race were 206 persons (16.4%).

The Census reported that 1,259 people (100% of the population) lived in households, 0 (0%) lived in non-institutionalized group quarters, and 0 (0%) were institutionalized.

There were 507 households, out of which 151 (29.8%) had children under the age of 18 living in them, 254 (50.1%) were opposite-sex married couples living together, 52 (10.3%) had a female householder with no husband present, 16 (3.2%) had a male householder with no wife present.  There were 52 (10.3%) unmarried opposite-sex partnerships, and 1 (0.2%) same-sex married couples or partnerships. 124 households (24.5%) were made up of individuals, and 29 (5.7%) had someone living alone who was 65 years of age or older. The average household size was 2.48.  There were 322 families (63.5% of all households); the average family size was 2.98.

The population was spread out, with 257 people (20.4%) under the age of 18, 112 people (8.9%) aged 18 to 24, 321 people (25.5%) aged 25 to 44, 461 people (36.6%) aged 45 to 64, and 108 people (8.6%) who were 65 years of age or older.  The median age was 41.1 years. For every 100 females there were 101.8 males.  For every 100 females age 18 and over, there were 97.6 males.

The homeowner vacancy rate was 1.5%; the rental vacancy rate was 2.3%.  832 people (66.1% of the population) lived in owner-occupied housing units and 427 people (33.9%) lived in rental housing units.

References

Further reading
Phillips, Julian. "Time catches up with idyllic small-town life." Los Angeles Times. June 30, 2003.

External links
 Santa Margarita climate at The Weather Channel

Census-designated places in San Luis Obispo County, California
Santa Lucia Range